Linda Goode Bryant (born July 21, 1949) is an African-American documentary filmmaker and activist. She founded the gallery Just Above Midtown (JAM), which will be the focus of an exhibition at the Museum of Modern Art in the fall of 2022, organized by curator Thomas Lax.

In 2009, Goode Bryant started Project EATS, an urban farming initiative for black and brown communities in New York City.

Early life, family, and education
Goode Bryant was born in Columbus, Ohio, to parents Floyd and Josephine Goode.

In 1972, Goode Bryant received her Bachelor of Art degree in studio art with a minor in drama at Spelman College in Atlanta, Georgia. In 1980, she received her Master of Business Administration degree in management from Columbia University in New York City.

Career
After graduating from Spelman College, Goode Bryant moved to New York City in 1972 and became a fellow at the Metropolitan Museum of Art and then was hired as the director of education at the Studio Museum in Harlem. Her work in museums highlighted the disparities in the art world and led her to found Just Above Midtown (JAM), a gallery that supported African-American artists and artists of color.

Just Above Midtown (1974–1986)
In 1974, at the age of 23, Goode Bryant founded Just Above Midtown (JAM), a New York City non-profit interdisciplinary artists’ space that spotlighted and supported new work by African-American artists and artists of color, many of whom created abstract work, used affordable materials, and created video and performance art. The first exhibition at the gallery, Synthesis: A combination of parts or elements into a complex whole on view from November 19–December 23, 1974, featured work by David Hammons, Camille Billops, Elizabeth Catlett, and Norman Lewis.

Originally located on West 57th Street, JAM was the first gallery space to exhibit the work of African-American artists and other artists of color in a major gallery district. At JAM’s inception, works by artists of color were primarily exhibited in community centers and cultural institutions in African-American, Native American, Latino and Asian communities. JAM was met with resentment and hostility from nearby galleries. JAM emerged during the recession and was created with the purpose to initiate social change. During this time there was a distinct difference in the value of white artists compared to non-white artists within the art industry. Goode Bryant intended JAM to be a place where black artists could be free from the oppressive views of the commercial industry.

In 1977, JAM moved to 178-80 Franklin Street in Tribeca as a result of an increase in rent costs. Tribeca offered a larger space and was located further downtown compared to the location on West 57th Street. While it continued to operate as a commercial gallery and exhibition space, Goode Bryant and her team emphasized live events, such as performances, readings, video screenings, and lectures which included business seminars. JAM initiated a seminar and service program called "The Business of Being an Artist". This program was meant to provide materials and opportunities for artists. In May 1982, Goode Bryant and Janet Henry published the first issue of Blackcurrant, a broadsheet publication that focused on the work of artists affiliated with JAM.

In 1984, JAM moved to its final location at 503 Broadway and ceased being a commercial gallery, instead functioning as studio space for artists. JAM's publication Blackcurrant became B Culture, was edited by Greg Tate and musician and producer Craig Dennis Street, and included features on music, art, literature, and popular culture. JAM officially closed in 1986.

JAM offered artists, many of which are now established figures in the field, early opportunities to show their work including David Hammons, Butch Morris, Senga Nengudi, Lorraine O’Grady, Maren Hassinger, Adrian Piper, Fred Wilson, and Howardena Pindell.

The Museum of Modern Art will present "Just Above Midtown: 1974 to the present," the first museum exhibition on the gallery. It will be curated by Thomas J. Lax and open in the Fall of 2022. It will present archival material historicizing the gallery alongside artwork shown at JAM.

Filmmaking
Goode Bryant co-produced and directed Flag Wars (2003) with Laura Poitras, which became a cinéma vérité Emmy Award-nominated documentary. Flag Wars was filmed over four years and was set in her hometown, Columbus, Ohio. The film explores the events that take place when white homosexual homebuyers move to a working class primarily black neighborhood resulting in conflicts due to the strong difference in culture and values of each group. This film displays themes of prejudice, gentrification, privilege, poverty, and politics. Goode Bryant and Poitras received the Center for Documentary Studies Filmmaker Award in 2003 for Flag Wars.

She also directed other films including a segment of Time Piece (2006), a documentary displaying the reflections of several American and Turkish Artists, Hurricane Teens (1998), Can You See Me Now? (2006), and a reality television documentary called Mustafa (2004). Apart from directing, Linda Goode Bryant was also a part of the film Colored Frames, a documentary that looks at the influences and experiences of black artists in the past fifty years.

Awards 
Goode Bryant has been recognized with numerous awards, including a Guggenheim Fellowship (2004) and Peabody Award. In 2020 she was recognized for her achievements by Anonymous Was A Woman, a grant-making organization focused on supporting women artists over 40 years of age.

Activism

Active Citizen Project (ACP) and Project EATS 
Goode Bryant is a Founder and the Executive Director of the Active Citizen Project (ACP), a non-profit organization that serves as a catalyst and laboratory for broad-based public activism using art and new media as tools for social change. Under the auspices of the Active Citizen Project, Goode Bryant also developed Project EATS in 2008 during the Global Food Crisis. Project EATS is a network of New York City urban farms that offers community programs and economic opportunities. She has a philosophy on art and how it relates to food and life. She expresses this through her involvement in Project EATS and believes in the importance of caring for others.

References

External links 
 Project EATS

1949 births
African-American art dealers
African-American film directors
American activists
American art dealers
Artists from Columbus, Ohio
Columbia Business School alumni
Film directors from Ohio
Living people
Spelman College alumni
Women art dealers